Roberto César Zardim Rodrigues, better known as Roberto (Sapiranga, December 19, 1985), is a Brazilian footballer who plays for Vitória.

Club career
Roberto went through a few clubs in Brazil and Niigata in Japan, until he transferred to Avai on April 30, 2009. At the beginning of the 2010 season, he was close to a transfer to Coritiba through an exchange by the athlete Marcos Aurélio, but the deal did not go ahead and Roberto stayed in Avaí.

Club statistics
(Correct )

Honours
Avaí
Campeonato Catarinense: 2010
FC Tokyo
J2 League: 2011
Coritiba
Campeonato Paranaense: 2012

References

External links
 

 
 

1985 births
Living people
Brazilian footballers
Association football forwards
Campeonato Brasileiro Série A players
Campeonato Brasileiro Série B players
Figueirense FC players
Avaí FC players
Criciúma Esporte Clube players
Coritiba Foot Ball Club players
J1 League players
J2 League players
Albirex Niigata players
FC Tokyo players
K League 1 players
Ulsan Hyundai FC players
Ceará Sporting Club players
Associação Atlética Ponte Preta players
Oeste Futebol Clube players
Esporte Clube Juventude players
Londrina Esporte Clube players
Esporte Clube Vitória players
Brazilian expatriate footballers
Brazilian expatriate sportspeople in Japan
Brazilian expatriate sportspeople in South Korea
Expatriate footballers in Japan
Expatriate footballers in South Korea